Otiorhynchus rhacusensis is a species in the weevil family (Curculionidae).

Subspecies 
 Otiorhynchus rhacusensis rhacusensis (Germar, 1822) 
 Otiorhynchus rhacusensis siculus Stierlin, 1861

Description 
Otiorhynchus rhacusensis can reach a length of  about 15 mm. The basic color of the body is whitish, with flat reddish granules on the pronotum and elytrae and reddish femurs.

Distribution 
This species is present in Bosnia and Herzegovina and Sicily.

References 

 Biolib
 Fauna Europaea
 EUNIS

Entiminae
Beetles described in 1822